Jennifer Lee Branam (born October 8, 1980) is an American former soccer goalkeeper. She played full–time professional soccer for San Diego Spirit of Women's United Soccer Association and Sky Blue FC of Women's Professional Soccer. Branam was a member of the United States women's national soccer team, winning six caps between 2000 and 2006.

She retired from soccer in 2011 to pursue a career as a nurse.

References

External links
 
 US Soccer player profile
 Sky Blue FC player profile
 WUSA player profile
 North Carolina player profile

1980 births
Living people
North Carolina Tar Heels women's soccer players
NJ/NY Gotham FC players
American women's soccer players
United States women's international soccer players
Bälinge IF players
Damallsvenskan players
San Diego Spirit players
Women's United Soccer Association players
Women's Professional Soccer players
American expatriate sportspeople in Sweden
Expatriate women's footballers in Sweden
American expatriate women's soccer players
Women's association football goalkeepers
Charlotte Lady Eagles players
USL W-League (1995–2015) players